Lúka is a village and municipality in Nové Mesto nad Váhom District in the Trenčín Region of western Slovakia.

History
In historical records the village was first mentioned in 1426.

Geography
The municipality lies at an altitude of 200 metres and covers an area of 17.407 km². It has a population of about 577 people.

Trivia
'Lúka' is the Slovak word for meadow.

References

External links

  Official page
https://web.archive.org/web/20070513023228/http://www.statistics.sk/mosmis/eng/run.html

Villages and municipalities in Nové Mesto nad Váhom District